WINGCON AG is a German company that operates in the telecommunications industry. The company is specialized to design, develop and provide telecom products and solutions as well as consulting services worldwide with focus on GSM-Railway. WINGCON's communication products include Blackbox Recording Centers (voice & video recording systems), Short Message Service Centers, SMS gateways, location-based services, as well as billing mediation devices.

References 

Telecommunications companies of Germany
GSM standard
Telecommunications equipment
Telecommunications systems
Mobile technology